Sandeep Rehaan is an Indian producer. He is the owner of Rehaan Records. He is best known for his works in Punjabi music industry.

Background 
Rehaan was born in Lambra, Jalandhar. He moved to Vancouver, Canada in 2000.

Career 
Rehaan began producing songs in 2017 with the song Soch by Karan Aujla. He owns Rehaan Records (music company). Singer Karan Aujla is associated with Rehaan and they are working together since 2017. Rehaan is best known for producing many single tracks, 14 of which have been featured in the UK Asian chart by Official Charts Company, while seven have featured in the Global YouTube music chart. His Produced songs like Don't Worry, Jhanjhar, Kya Baat Aa, Sheikh , Hint, Chitta Kurta, Maxico and It Ain't Legal featured in various music charts.

Produced songs

Albums

Charted

Uncharted

References 

Indian producers
Indian record producers
Living people
Year of birth missing (living people)